Sybra unifasciata is a species of beetle in the family Cerambycidae. It was described by Fujimura in 1956.

References

unifasciata
Beetles described in 1956